Sundance Power Plant is an unincorporated community in Alberta, Canada within Parkland County that is recognized as a designated place by Statistics Canada.

Demographics 
As a designated place in the 2016 Census of Population conducted by Statistics Canada, Sundance Power Plant recorded a population of 0 living in 0 of its 0 total private dwellings, no change from its 2011 population of 0.

As a designated place in the 2011 Census, Sundance Power Plant had a population of 0 living in 0 of its 0 total dwellings, a 0% change from its 2006 population of 0.

See also 
List of communities in Alberta

References 

Former designated places in Alberta
Localities in Parkland County